Berkheide is a 1700 ha. large dunal area on the Dutch North Sea coast between Scheveningen and Katwijk. It lies largely in the municipality of Wassenaar, South Holland and forms together with the area Meijendel the Natura 2000 area Meijendel & Berkheide. It is part of the Hollands Duin management unit (for owner Staatsbosbeheer). Berkheide is also the name of former village that was located in the area for several hundred years.

Landforms of South Holland